"A Matter of Time" is a song recorded by Belgian singer-songwriter Sennek, best known for representing Belgium in the Eurovision Song Contest 2018. Sennek co-wrote the track with Alex Callier and Maxime Tribèche. The song was officially released on 5 March 2018, one day before its scheduled release, as it was already leaked on YouTube.

Eurovision Song Contest

On 28 September 2017, Flemish broadcaster VRT announced Laura Groeseneken as the Belgian entrant at the Eurovision Song Contest 2018 during the talk show Van Gils & gasten, aired on Één. It was later announced that Groeseneken will perform under her stage name Sennek.

The song was initially scheduled to be released on 6 March 2018 but was eventually released one day earlier after it was leaked on YouTube.

Sennek's "A Matter of Time" competed in the first semi-final, held on 8 May 2018 in Lisbon, Portugal, but did not qualify for the Grand Final.

Track listing

Charts

Weekly charts

Year-end charts

References

Eurovision songs of 2018
Eurovision songs of Belgium
2018 debut singles
Songs written by Alex Callier
English-language Belgian songs